Kemelho Nguena (born 10 July 2000) is a French professional footballer of Cameroonian descent who plays as a midfielder for Latvian Higher League club Riga.

Professional career
Nguena made his professional debut with Troyes in a 1–0 Ligue 2 win over Rodez on 17 October 2020.

On 27 August 2021 he signed a 1.5-year contract with Bulgarian club Slavia Sofia.

In February 2023, Nguena joined Latvian Higher League club Riga.

References

External links
 

2000 births
Sportspeople from Poitiers
French sportspeople of Cameroonian descent
Living people
French footballers
Association football midfielders
ES Troyes AC players
PFC Slavia Sofia players
Riga FC players
Ligue 2 players
Championnat National 3 players
First Professional Football League (Bulgaria) players
French expatriate footballers
Expatriate footballers in Bulgaria
French expatriate sportspeople in Bulgaria
Expatriate footballers in Latvia
French expatriate sportspeople in Latvia
Footballers from Nouvelle-Aquitaine